Aberdeen, Ontario can mean the following places:
Aberdeen, Algoma District, Ontario, a geographic township within Unorganized North Algoma District
Aberdeen, Grey County, Ontario
Aberdeen, Prescott and Russell County, Ontario